Josué Edmond Blocus (born 20 November 1969) is a French heavyweight boxer who competed in the 1996 Olympics. Blocus is a black Frenchman whose family is from Guadeloupe.

Amateur career
At the 1996 European Championships in Vejle, Denmark, he beat Zoran Manojlovic (Yugoslavia) but lost to Serguei Lyakhovich (Belarus) on points.

At the 1996 Olympics in Atlanta he fought as a superheavyweight and beat Jesús Guevara, Venezuela, RSC-2 (02:13) but was stopped in the second round by big-punching Adalat Mamedov, Azerbaijan by RSC-1 (02:11).

Professional career
He turned pro in 1997, showing big power in six early wins, including one over Sedreck Fields. He then fought only five times over the next five years before getting outpointed in 2002 by Friday Ahunanya and knocked out by club fighter Guerrero (record 15-6). In 2007, at age 37, he rebounded and scored the biggest win of his pro career, beating Canadian champion David Cadieux on the road.

Professional boxing record

|-
|align="center" colspan=8|16 Wins (14 knockouts, 2 decisions), 2 Losses (1 knockout, 1 decision) 
|-
| align="center" style="border-style: none none solid solid; background: #e3e3e3"|Result
| align="center" style="border-style: none none solid solid; background: #e3e3e3"|Record
| align="center" style="border-style: none none solid solid; background: #e3e3e3"|Opponent
| align="center" style="border-style: none none solid solid; background: #e3e3e3"|Type
| align="center" style="border-style: none none solid solid; background: #e3e3e3"|Round
| align="center" style="border-style: none none solid solid; background: #e3e3e3"|Date
| align="center" style="border-style: none none solid solid; background: #e3e3e3"|Location
| align="center" style="border-style: none none solid solid; background: #e3e3e3"|Notes
|-align=center
|Win
|
|align=left| Darryl Holley
|TKO
|1
|09/10/2010
|align=left| Atlanta, Georgia, U.S.
|align=left|
|-
|Win
|
|align=left| David Cadieux
|SD
|12
|12/05/2007
|align=left| Montreal, Quebec, Canada
|align=left|
|-
|Win
|
|align=left| Nicolai Firtha
|TKO
|7
|16/06/2006
|align=left| Duluth, Georgia, U.S.
|align=left|
|-
|Win
|
|align=left| Eric Starr
|TKO
|4
|16/12/2005
|align=left| Atlanta, Georgia, U.S.
|align=left|
|-
|Loss
|
|align=left| Ron Guerrero
|RTD
|5
|15/02/2003
|align=left| Las Vegas, Nevada, U.S.
|align=left|
|-
|Loss
|
|align=left| Friday Ahunanya
|SD
|10
|01/06/2002
|align=left| Atlantic City, New Jersey, U.S.
|align=left|
|-
|Win
|
|align=left| Albert Stewart
|TKO
|3
|30/03/2002
|align=left| Reading, Pennsylvania, U.S.
|align=left|
|-
|Win
|
|align=left| Kevin Rosier
|TKO
|1
|09/12/2000
|align=left| Villeurbanne, France
|align=left|
|-
|Win
|
|align=left| Mario Cawley
|UD
|6
|28/11/2000
|align=left| Las Vegas, Nevada, U.S.
|align=left|
|-
|Win
|
|align=left| Clarence Goins
|TKO
|1
|13/11/1999
|align=left| Las Vegas, Nevada, U.S.
|align=left|
|-
|Win
|
|align=left| Lou Turichiarelli
|TKO
|1
|12/06/1999
|align=left| Wilmington, Massachusetts, U.S.
|align=left|
|-
|Win
|
|align=left| Juan Pablo Rodriguez
|TKO
|1
|09/05/1998
|align=left| Sacramento, California, U.S.
|align=left|
|-
|Win
|
|align=left| Gene Jones
|KO
|2
|18/10/1997
|align=left| Las Vegas, Nevada, U.S.
|align=left|
|-
|Win
|
|align=left| Ronnie Smith
|TKO
|3
|17/06/1997
|align=left| Bay Saint Louis, Mississippi, U.S.
|align=left|
|-
|Win
|
|align=left| James Lester
|TKO
|1
|07/06/1997
|align=left| Sacramento, California, U.S.
|align=left|
|-
|Win
|
|align=left| Alonzo Hollis
|TKO
|3
|14/05/1997
|align=left| Montreal, Quebec, Canada
|align=left|
|-
|Win
|
|align=left| Sedreck Fields
|KO
|1
|05/05/1997
|align=left| Atlantic City, New Jersey, U.S.
|align=left|
|-
|Win
|
|align=left| Russell Pugh
|KO
|1
|26/04/1997
|align=left| Atlantic City, New Jersey, U.S.
|align=left|
|}

External links
 
 sports-reference

1969 births
Living people
French people of Guadeloupean descent
Heavyweight boxers
Super-heavyweight boxers
Boxers at the 1996 Summer Olympics
Olympic boxers of France
French male boxers